Verkhnekargino (Ürge Qarğawıl) is a rural locality (a village) in Asyanovsky Selsoviet, Dyurtyulinsky District, Bashkortostan, Russia. The population was 36 as of 2010. There are 2 streets.

Geography 
Verkhnekargino is located 18 km southwest of Dyurtyuli (the district's administrative centre) by road. Asyanovo is the nearest rural locality.

References 

Rural localities in Dyurtyulinsky District